The list of shipwrecks in August 1828 includes all ships sunk, foundered, grounded, or otherwise lost during August 1828.

6 August

8 August

9 August

10 August

12 August

14 August

15 August

16 August

19 August

20 August

22 August

23 August

25 August

26 August

30 August

31 August

Unknown date

References

1828-08